Tammy Faye is a biographic stage musical with music by Elton John, lyrics by Jake Shears and a book by James Graham, based on the life of Tammy Faye Messner.

Production history

World premiere: London (2022) 
Tammy Faye had its world premiere production at the Almeida Theatre in London, previewing from 13 October 2022 (with an official press night on 26 October) running until 2 December. The production was due to close on the 3 December, however due to illness in the cast the final performances were cancelled. The production is directed by the Almeida's artistic director Rupert Goold with choreography by Lynne Page, design by Bunny Christie, costume design by Katrina Lindsay and lighting design by Neil Austin.

The cast included Katie Brayben as Tammy Faye and Andrew Rannells as Jim Bakker.

Cast and characters

Musical numbers

Act I
 "PTL Prologue" 
 "Light of the World" 
 "If Only Love" 
 "PTL TV Theme" 
 "Open Hands/Right Kind of Faith" 
 "He's Inside Me" 
 "Satellite of God" 
 "God's House/Heritage USA" 
 "Empty Hands" 

Act II
 "Prime Time" 
 "Run This Show" 
 "Right Kind of Faith (Reprise)" 
 "He Promised Me" 
 "Bring Me The Face of Tammy Bakker" 
 "God's House (Reprise)" 
 "Look How Far We've Fallen" 
 "If You Came To See Me Cry" 
 "See You In Heaven"

Critical reception 
The musical received positive reviews from audiences and critics including four star reviews from The Guardian, Time Out, The Independent, Financial Times, WhatsOnStage, and The Sunday Times.

Awards

References 

2022 musicals
Biographical musicals
British musicals
Musicals by Elton John
Plays by James Graham